Hope R. Stevens (February 4, 1905 – June 24, 1982) was a lawyer, political and civic activist, and businessman.

Early life and education
Born in Tortola in the British Virgin Islands and raised on Nevis, he was one of the founders of the Barbados Labour Party. Stevens moved to the United States in 1924 and graduated from City College of New York in 1933 and Brooklyn Law School in 1936. He was admitted to the New York bar in 1937. He was later based in Harlem, New York, and became the president of the Uptown Chamber of Commerce from 1960 to 1977.

Career
As the  "Co-chairperson of the National Conference of Black Lawyers of the United States and Canada," he appeared as the defense counsel during the trial in absentia of Pol Pot and Ieng Sary at the People's Revolutionary Tribunal (Cambodia) held by the Vietnamese-backed People's Republic of Kampuchea in Phnom Penh in 1979.  Stevens belonged to the New York branch of the Association of Democratic Lawyers.

Stevens was awarded the Order of the British Empire for his public service in fighting for self-determination for Caribbean Islands such as his native St. Kitts-Nevis.

References

People from Tortola
1905 births
1982 deaths
British Virgin Islands emigrants to the United States
British Virgin Islands emigrants to Saint Kitts and Nevis
20th-century American lawyers
Brooklyn Law School alumni